Francis Gómez (born October 1, 1968) is a retired female judoka from Venezuela. She competed for her native South American country at the 1996 Summer Olympics, where she lost in the semifinals of the Women's Half-Heavyweight (– 72 kg) division to France's Estha Essombe. Gómez claimed a total number of three medals during her career at the Pan American Games.

References

1968 births
Living people
Venezuelan female judoka
Judoka at the 1996 Summer Olympics
Olympic judoka of Venezuela
Judoka at the 1991 Pan American Games
Judoka at the 1995 Pan American Games
Pan American Games silver medalists for Venezuela
Pan American Games bronze medalists for Venezuela
Pan American Games medalists in judo
Medalists at the 1991 Pan American Games
Medalists at the 1995 Pan American Games
20th-century Venezuelan women